The 1931 LSU Tigers football team was an American football team that represented Louisiana State University (LSU) during the 1931 college football season as a member of the Southern Conference. In their fourth year under head coach Russ Cohen, the Tigers compiled an overall record of 5–4, with a mark of 3–2 in conference play. The 35–0 victory over Spring Hill was the first night-game in Tiger Stadium.

Schedule

References

LSU
LSU Tigers football seasons
LSU Tigers football